Ethan Hitchcock may refer to:
 Ethan A. Hitchcock (general) (1798–1870), U.S. Army general
 Ethan A. Hitchcock (Interior) (1835–1909), United States Secretary of the Interior; nephew of the former